Vincenzo Ceci (born 21 April 1964) is an Italian former cyclist. He competed in the sprint event at the 1984 Summer Olympics.

References

External links
 

1964 births
Living people
Italian male cyclists
Olympic cyclists of Italy
Cyclists at the 1984 Summer Olympics
People from Ascoli Piceno
Sportspeople from the Province of Ascoli Piceno
Cyclists from Marche